In particle physics, the Breit frame (also known as infinite-momentum frame or IMF) is a frame of reference used to describe scattering experiments of the form , that is experiments in which particle A scatters off particle B, possibly producing particles  in the process. The frame is defined so that the particle A has its momentum reversed in the scattering process.

Another way of understanding the Breit frame is to look at the elastic scattering . It is only in the latter case the Breit frame gets related to infinite-momentum frame.

It is named after the American physicist Gregory Breit.

See also
Center-of-momentum frame
Laboratory frame of reference

References

Frames of reference
Kinematics